Kurt Barnes (born 25 May 1981) is an Australian professional golfer.

Barnes was born in Muswellbrook, New South Wales. He had a successful amateur career which included victories in the 2002 Australian Amateur, the 2003 Riversdale Cup, which he won with a record 22 under par total, and the 2003 New Zealand Amateur Stroke Play Championship. He turned professional at the end of 2003 and joined the PGA Tour of Australasia.

In 2009 Barnes became the first Australian to win on the Omega China Tour, when he claimed victory in the Sofitel Zhongshan IGC Open. He went on to head the tour's Order of Merit that season, before winning his place on the Japan Golf Tour by finishing first at the tour's qualifying school.

Amateur wins
2002 New South Wales Medal (tied with Adam Groom), Australian Amateur
2003 Riversdale Cup, New Zealand Amateur Stroke Play Championship

Professional wins (6)

Japan Golf Tour wins (1)

OneAsia Tour wins (1)

*Note: The 2011 SK Telecom Open was shortened to 54 holes due to fog.
1Co-sanctioned by the Korean Tour

Von Nida Tour wins (2)

Omega China Tour wins (1)
2009 Sofitel Zhongshan IGC Open

Other wins (1)
2005 Meriton Sydney Invitational

Results in major championships

CUT = missed the half-way cut
"T" = tied

Team appearances
Amateur
Australian Men's Interstate Teams Matches (representing New South Wales): 2002 (winners), 2003

References

External links

 Kurt Barnes player profile, Golf Australia

Australian male golfers
Japan Golf Tour golfers
PGA Tour of Australasia golfers
People from New South Wales
1981 births
Living people